{{DISPLAYTITLE:C7H10O5}}
The molecular formula C7H10O5 may refer to:

 Diethyl oxomalonate, the diethyl ester of mesoxalic acid
 Shikimic acid, a cyclohexene, cyclitol, and cyclohexanecarboxylic acid

Molecular formulas